Gangkiz was a South Korean girl group formed by Core Contents Media. Consisting of members Jihyun, Sooeun, Hae-in, Somin, Eunbyul, Esther, and Hyeji, the group debuted in May 2012, with their first extended play, We Became Gang. In April 2013, it was revealed that all members, with the exception of Esther and Hyeji, had departed the group. The remaining members are presumed to have disbanded sometime in 2014. No official announcement regarding the group's dissolution was ever made.

Career

2012: We Became Gang and MAMA
Gangkiz was originally created by Core Contents Media, but later moved to a subsidiary label, GM Contents Media, before their debut. The group officially debuted on May 15, 2012 with the release of their debut album We Became Gang.  They held their debut live performance on May 18 through "KBS Music Bank. Gangkiz released a seven-part music video for their debut song "Honey Honey", which is described as an "upgraded version of T-ara's "Roly-Poly" and "Lovey-Dovey" with a more mature concept".

The group released a repackaged mini-album titled "MAMA" on June 26, 2012. The music video for "MAMA" was released on June 22, 2012. The group was transferred from GM Contents Media back to Core Contents Media in October 2012.

2013-2014 Member Departures and Disbandment
With no releases for the remainder of 2012, Gangkiz was scheduled to make a comeback in early 2013. However, after opening CCM's official fancafé, it was revealed that most of the original line-up had quietly withdrawn from the group, and that only Esther and Hyeji remained. Haein subsequently confirmed her departure. In 2014, Hyeji's Twitter account was deleted, Esther's went inactive, and the group's official fancafé was shut down. Although Core Contents Media has never released an official statement, the group is believed to have completely disbanded.

Members
 Jihyun (지현)
Choi Soo-eun (수은)
Lee Hae-in (해인)
 Somin (소민)
Jo Eun-byul (은별)
 Esther (에스더)
 Hyeji (혜지)

Discography

Extended plays

Singles

Videography

Music videos

References

External links
Official Gangkiz Twitter

K-pop music groups
MBK Entertainment artists
Musical groups established in 2012
South Korean dance music groups
South Korean girl groups
2012 establishments in South Korea
Musical groups disestablished in 2014